Ɓ (minuscule: ɓ), called "B-hook" or "B with a hook", is a letter of the Latin alphabet and the International African Alphabet. Its lower-case form, represents a voiced bilabial implosive in the International Phonetic Alphabet. It is used to spell that sound in various languages, notably Fula and Hausa. It was also formerly used in or at least proposed for Xhosa and Zulu.

In Unicode, the upper case Ɓ is in the Latin Extended B range (U+0181), and the lower case ɓ is in the IPA range (U+0253).  In Shona the upper case form is a just a larger form of the lower case letter.

Alternative or obsolete capital form

The Practical Orthography for African Languages (1930 ed.) used a different capital form, similar to the Cyrillic letter be (Б). A New Testament in the Loma language of Liberia, which was typeset in 1971, used this capital form.

See also

Similar letters
Ƃ ƃ (Zhuang)
Б б (Cyrillic)
ᵷ (lowercase turned g)

Alphabets with this letter
Africa Alphabet
African reference alphabet
Pan-Nigerian alphabet
Alphabets for the following specific languages:
Fula (see also Fula orthographies)
Hausa

Notes

References

"Latin Extended B: Range 0180-024F" (Unicode code chart)
"IPA Extensions: Range 0250-02AF" (Unicode code chart)

External links
Practical Orthography of African Languages

Latin letters with diacritics
Phonetic transcription symbols